La Huacana may refer to
 La Huacana Municipality
 La Huacana, La Huacana, place in La Huacana Municipality
 La Huacana, San Lucas, place in San Lucas Municipality, Michoacán